Kazi Bashir is a Bangladeshi Cinematographer and  Make-Up artist. He won the Bangladesh National Film Award for Best Cinematography for the film Ghrina (1994).

Selected films
 Protiggya - 1980
 Badhon Hara - 1981
 Naat Bou - 1982
 Boro Bhalo Lok Chhilo - 1982
 Griho Bibad - 1986
 Dhoni Gareeb -1987
 Khotipuron - 1989
 Khoma - 1992
 Tumi Amar - 1994
 Ghrina - 1994
 Asha Bhalobasha - 1995

Awards and nominations
National Film Awards

References

External links
 

Living people
Bangladeshi cinematographers
Best Cinematographer National Film Award (Bangladesh) winners
Year of birth missing (living people)